Noel Albert Gugliemi (also known as Noel G.) is an American actor best known for his portrayals of Southern Californian gangsters. Gugliemi has received some notoriety for having played characters named Hector in several movies and TV shows.

Life and work
Gugliemi is of Italian and Mexican descent. He was abandoned by his parents, so he became homeless and entered into a criminal life.

In 2001, Noel played Hector in The Fast and the Furious, which boosted his career. He reprised his role in Furious 7 and in the Fast & Furious music video, the latter alongside Chingy, iRome, Neil Brown Jr., Ray Lavender, Sarayah Love "Empire", & Chloe Riley.

Gugliemi is a Christian and regularly delivers motivational speeches at churches, schools and businesses. Although he often plays gangsters, Gugliemi speaks with young people to tell them not to get involved with gangs.

Filmography

Film and TV Movies

Television

Video Games

References

External links
 
 

American male film actors
Living people
American people of Italian descent
American male actors of Mexican descent
Place of birth missing (living people)
Year of birth missing (living people)
20th-century American male actors
21st-century American male actors
American male television actors